Metachroma luridum, the dark-sided metachroma, is a species of leaf beetle. It is found in the eastern United States, where its range spans from Texas to Florida and New Jersey, and in Mexico. Its length is between 3.5 and 4.0 mm.

References

Further reading

 

Eumolpinae
Articles created by Qbugbot
Beetles described in 1808
Taxa named by Guillaume-Antoine Olivier
Beetles of North America